Juraj Lovrov Zadranin or Juraj Lovrin (active during the fourteenth century) was a Croatian architect and builder, born in Zadar and mostly active in Dubrovnik.

He was a member of an architect family. His father Lovro /Laurence/ was a master builder in Zadar by the end of the thirteenth and the beginning of the fourteenth century. He had brothers Nikola /Nicholas/, Anđeo /Angel/ and Petar /Peter/, who all succeeded his father's business and expanded it.

At the beginning of the fourteenth century he settled in Dubrovnik and started his own business. In documents he is mentioned to have possessed a stonemasonry workshop in Dubrovnik in 1314. There he had an apprentice  named Osroje Bogdanović from the Konavle region. His brother Nikola joined him in December 1316 and both of them obliged to work for the Dubrovnik Dominican Monastery, one of the most important architectural structures in the City of Dubrovnik, established in 1225 and completed in the fourteenth century. The brothers Juraj and Nikola built it in a simple Gothic architectural style. 

While Juraj was active in Dubrovnik, his brothers Anđeo and Petar were later working as architects and builders in Dubrovnik and Kotor as well.

See also 
List of Croatian architects
List of people from Zadar

References

Year of death unknown
Year of birth unknown
Architects from Zadar
14th-century Croatian people
History of Dalmatia